All-Pac-12 may refer to:
List of All-Pac-12 Conference football teams
List of All-Pac-12 Conference men's basketball teams
List of All-Pac-12 Conference women's basketball teams
List of All-Pac-12 Conference men's soccer teams